Lee G. Copeland (born March 26, 1937) is an American architect and urban designer.  He served as Dean of the University of Washington College of Architecture and Urban Planning (now College of Built Environments) from 1972 to 1979 and thereafter as Dean of the University of Pennsylvania Graduate School of Fine Arts (now PennDesign) from 1979 to 1991.  He is currently a consulting principal at Mithun.

Copeland was elected a Fellow in the American Institute of Architects in 1979.  He won the AIA Seattle Chapter Medal in 2000, and in 2001 he received the  AIA/ACSA Topaz Medallion for Excellence in Architectural Education.

Career
Before and during his time as Dean, from 1964 to 1979, Copeland taught in the University of Washington as a teaching assistant and as a professor. Afterwards, he was an Architect in Philadelphia, becoming chairman of the Philadelphia City Planning Commission in the 1980's while being Dean of the University of Pennsylvania. And from 2014 to 2018 he became a member in the City of Seattle Design Commission during his time as Consulting principal at Mithun in 2003.

Education
In 1955, Copeland graduated in Roosevelt High School (Washington), and went on to pursue a Bachelor of Architecture at the University of Washington, completing it in 1960. Soon after, he finished his Master of City Planning and Master of Architecture at the University of Pennsylvania in 1963.

References

External links
 AIA Seattle Honors Archive

Fellows of the American Institute of Architects
Architects from Seattle
University of Pennsylvania faculty
University of Washington faculty
Living people
American architects
American urban planners
University of Washington College of Built Environments alumni
University of Pennsylvania School of Design alumni
1937 births